The 1854 Delaware gubernatorial election was held on November 7, 1854. Incumbent Democratic Governor William H. H. Ross was unable to seek re-election. His 1850 opponent, former State Representative Peter F. Causey, ran as the American Party candidate, and faced former Kent County Sheriff William Burton, the Democratic nominee. Causey ultimately defeated Burton by a slim, but decisive, margin.

General election

Results

References

Bibliography
 
 
 
 Delaware House Journal, 65th General Assembly, 1st Reg. Sess. (1855).

1854
Delaware
Gubernatorial